Na Haeo is the westernmost district (amphoe) of Loei province, northeastern Thailand.

History
Na Haeo area was the rural part of Dan Sai district. For people in Na Haeo it was inconvenient due to the distance involved. The government split off the two tambons Na Haeo and Na Phueng from Dan Sai District and created a minor district (king amphoe) on 15 February 1970. It was upgraded to a full district on 8 September 1976.

Geography
Neighboring districts are (from the east clockwise): Dan Sai of Loei Province, Nakhon Thai and Chat Trakan of Phitsanulok province. To the north is Xaignabouli province of Laos.

The important water resource is the Hueang River.

Phu Suan Sai National Park is in this district.

The northern part of the district reaches the southern end of the Luang Prabang Range mountain area of the Thai highlands.

Administration
The district is divided into five subdistricts (tambons), which are further subdivided into 34 villages (mubans). Na Haeo is a township (thesaban tambon) which covers parts of tambon Na Haeo. There are a further four tambon administrative organizations (TAO).

References

External links
amphoe.com

Na Haeo